Kendra Morris (born April 10, 1981) is an American soul singer-songwriter based in New York City, originally from St. Petersburg, Florida.

Career
Morris was a contestant on Fuse TV's Redemption Song. She was signed to Wax Poetics, and in 2011 released her first single, "Concrete Waves" (which later received a remix from DJ Premier). Also in 2011, she joined Dennis Coffey on tour, performing lead vocals. Her debut album, Banshee, was released in August 2012 from Naïve Records. Her sophomore release Mockingbird, a covers record was released on Wax Poetics on July 30, 2013.

In 2013, her cover of Pink Floyd's "Shine On You Crazy Diamond" was featured in early trailers for the film Dead Man Down. The use of the song was well received, with Movieline calling it "kind of amazing",<ref>{{cite web|url=: 'Dead Man Downs First Trailer Gives Bright Lights, Moody City|first=Ross A.|last=Lincoln|date=January 3, 2013|website=Movieline.com|accessdate=April 6, 2018}}</ref> ScreenCrush saying it "lends the movie an eerie and beautiful grandeur", and BuzzSugar said the "powerful" song was what made the trailer "pop".

Her song "Banshee" was featured in the season one episode of Ray Donovan "Fite Nite".

On June 17, 2016, Morris released her third album, titled Babble.

Morris was featured on the single "Phantoms" with Open Mike Eagle and Vinnie Paz on the Czarface-MF Doom collaboration album Czarface Meets Metal Face, and directed and animated the official video for the single "Bomb Thrown". She again collaborated with Czarface when she was featured on two tracks ("Morning Ritual" and "The King Heard Voices") on their collaboration album with Ghostface Killah, Czarface Meets Ghostface.

A new album titled Nine Lives'' is due for release on February 18, 2022. "Penny Pincher" was released as its lead single.

Discography

Albums

Singles

References

External links

Kendra Morris at Wax Poetics
Kendra Morris at Bandcamp
Kendra's profile for Redemption Song at Fuse TV

American soul singers
Living people
1981 births
Singers from New York City
Writers from St. Petersburg, Florida
Musicians from St. Petersburg, Florida
21st-century American singers
21st-century American women singers